The Women's World Chess Championship 2000 was a change from previous championship cycle in that, for the first time, it consisted of a 64-player knock-out tournament which took place from November 27 to December 16, 2000 in New Delhi, India.  Despite the change in format, the tournament was still won by defending champion Xie Jun of China, who beat her compatriot Qin Kanying in the final by 2½ to 1½.

Participants

This is the list of participants, ranked according to their Elo ratings on the October 2000 list. Due to a few late withdrawals, the final number of competitors was only 61.

Notable top players not taking part were Judit Polgár (ranked the no. 1 woman in the world), Wang Pin (ranked 7th), Antoaneta Stefanova (11th), Sofia Polgar (14th), and Harriet Hunt (18th).

As Women's World Champion, Xie Jun was invited to participate in the concurrent open event, but chose to try to defend her title instead.

Results

Final match 

{| class="wikitable" style="text-align:center"
|+Women's World Championship Final 2000
|-
! !! Rating !! 1 !! 2 !! 3 !! 4 !! Total
|-
| align=left |  || 2484
| style="background:black; color:white"| 0 || ½ ||style="background:black; color:white"| ½ || ½ || 1½
|-
| align=left |  || 2567
| 1 ||style="background:black; color:white"| ½ || ½ ||style="background:black; color:white"| ½ || 2½
|}

Bracket

References

Women's World Chess Championships
2000 in chess